Sir Ian William Wark CMG CBE FAA (8 May 1899 – 20 April 1985) was an  Australian chemist and scientific administrator. He was the recipient of the ANZAAS Medal in 1973. After his death, the Ian Wark Research Institute was established in 1994. This endeavored to support new innovative research methods with other organisations including the CSIRO. The first Director of the Institute was John Ralston AO, from 1994 to 2015.

References

Fellows of the Australian Academy of Science
Australian chemists
1899 births
1985 deaths
Knights Bachelor
Companions of the Order of St Michael and St George
Commanders of the Order of the British Empire